A grandmother is a mother of someone's parent.

Grandmother may also refer to:
 Grandmother (1921 film), a Czech drama film
 Grandmother (1940 film), a Czech drama film 
 Grandmother (2009 film), a French-Filipino independent drama film
 The Grandmother (1970 film), a short film by David Lynch
 The Grandmother (1981 film), a Colombian drama film
 The Grandmother (2021 film), a Spanish-French horror film